A karung guni, also spelled as karang guni, is a type of scrap dealer in Singapore. Its practitioners are a modern form of rag and bone man that visit residences door-to-door to acquire unwanted items.

Etymology 
"Karung guni" is a Malay phrase for gunny sack, which was used in the past to hold the newspapers. The karung guni would haul the heavy sacks on their backs as they walked their rounds to do the collection. Today, most of them use a hand truck instead.

Business practice 
Karung guni either walk along corridors (if that particular HDB estate has a multistorey car park) or for certain HDB estates where the carpark is right under the HDB blocks, walk through the carpark downstairs honking a horn. Around landed properties, they may drive around in a lorry with a horn attached to it, instead of going door-to-door. They make visits in carts, collecting old newspapers and other unwanted items. These will be resold at specialized markets and eventually recycled or reused. 

These people can be distinguished by their use of horns or (rarely) hand bell and shouts of "karang guni, poh zhua gu sa kor, pai leh-lio, dian si ki..." ("Rag and bone, newspapers and old clothes, spoilt radios, televisions" in Singaporean Hokkien) when making their rounds. Depending on the person, a nominal fee is paid for the quantity of newspapers or unwanted items sold.

The karung guni industry is made highly profitable due to the dense urban nature of Singapore, where hundreds of public housing apartment units are located in one block, with often a dozen blocks in each housing estate. This gives the karang guni men large access to sources of scrap. There are reported stories of rag-to-riches, karung guni men who have become millionaires just from the karang guni business. Today, however, competition is usually too great due to the over-saturation.

In the past, second-hand items in good condition bought by the karung guni are usually resold in flea markets such at the now defunct Sungei Road, though in recent times some have begun listing items additionally on online auctions. Because karung guni are motivated by the resale value of these materials on the market, there are also reported cases where some collectors have been selective in what to receive from households, even though they may be still recyclable or reusable.

At the beginning of the 21st century, karung guni men have been facing competition due to recycling initiatives and charities that directly collect from residents material to be recycled.

References

See also
Culture of Singapore

Singaporean culture
Singlish
Cleaning and maintenance occupations
Informal occupations
Waste collection